Brief Garden  is a landscape garden and former home in Beruwala, Sri Lanka designed by landscape architect and owner Bevis Bawa. It is home to the landscape design practice, Brief Garden Designs.

In 1929 Bawa was bequeathed the family rubber plantation by his mother, Bertha Marianne née Schrader (1876–1946). The estate's unique name was derived from the fact it was purchased by his father, Benjamin, with funds from a successful legal brief. Bawa realised that he lacked the self-discipline to operate and maintain a successful plantation and focused instead on developing the estate's garden. He continually worked on the garden until his death in 1992. The estate was inherited by his employees, with Doohlan de Silva, currently managing the property.

Description
The entrance to the garden is located through to ornate gateposts, crowned with male and female figures. The gateposts were created by Bawa and Donald Friend, an Australian artist and represent a fusion of Eastern and Western influences. The path then leads to two additional entrances. The first, a black and white door set in a mustard yellow wall, leads to the house via a curved staircase. The second leads down into the garden but screens any views of the house.

Further reading

External links
 Official site

See also

 Lunuganga

References

Tourist attractions in Kalutara District